The Delta Study is a CBSE syllabus high school  in Kochi, India . Established in 1976, Delta Study has approximately 1000 students and 47 teachers.

Staff 
The pupil teacher ratio is 1:15. Teachers attend workshops, seminars and training programs to keep abreast with changes introduced in the field of education. The staff of Delta stage programs on Children's Day and PTA Day. They participate in inter-staff games and matches. They accompany children on picnics, excursions and field trips, Onam, Christmas.

Publications 
Delta Pulse is a school newsletter published in October and April annually. 

Harmony is an annual school magazine that publishes literary writings, drawings, current events at the school and sports results. Many Harmony articles and artworks are created by the students. 

Class 4 maintains a manuscript magazine where students design and publish their class articles.

Club and Sports Activities 
Delta clubs include a Music Club, History Club, Arts Club, Science Club, Dance Club and Nature Club.

Delta organizes Football tournaments every year that are attended by schools including Bhavans Girinagar, Naval Children's School, Assisi and many others. Delta also sends its students to participate in various sports activities. 

Delta students are divided into four groups: Rumi, Copernicus, Ramanuja and Schweitzer. Many inter-house competitions are held every year. The groups competed in several sports each year on Sports Day 

Delta has facilities for football, cricket, volleyball, badminton, sepaktakraw, throwball, table tennis, basketball and tennis.

Infrastructure 
Delta has labs for Physics, Chemistry, Biology and Computers.   The school also has a junior computer lab/AV room and library.  Delta has an auditorium for stage-shows, seminars, workshops, indoor activities, and meetings, etc. 

The main block of Delta is the heritage building, which houses the kindergarten, the administrative departments, the Math, Computer and Language labs, the AV room and the canteen. The academic block contains 24 classrooms and staff rooms; and the auditorium, science labs and library. The Physical Education Department, music room and art room occupy the three corners of the campus.

Career guidance 
Twelfth grade students planning their education and careers can listen to outside speakers discuss career opportunities and the preparation required to utilize them. Representatives of NGOs, career-counseling organizations, coaching centres visit the school and address students on career-related topics.

Tenth grade students are advised to take an aptitude test to identify their areas of interest and aptitude which can guide their selection of electives at the twelfth grade level. Alumni volunteer to talk to their juniors .

PTA 
Delta organizes PTA meetings, open houses, seminars, and academic meetings in large numbers.

References 

Universities and colleges in Kochi
High school course levels
Educational institutions established in 1976
1976 establishments in Kerala